ROKS Daejeon (FFG-823) is the fifth ship of the Daegu-class frigate in the Republic of Korea Navy. She is named after the city, Daejeon.

Development 

Modifications to the Incheon-class include a TB-250K towed array sonar system and a 16-cell Korean Vertical Launching System (K-VLS) that is able to deploy the K-SAAM, Hong Sang Eo anti-submarine missile, and Haeryong tactical land attack cruise missiles.

The hull design is generally based on the one of the Incheon-class. However, as a part of weapon system modifications, the superstructure has been significantly changed. The hangar and a hellicopter deck on stern has been enlarged to support the operation of a 10-ton helicopter.

Construction and career 
ROKS Daejeon was launched on 3 May 2021 by Daewoo Shipbuilding.

References

2021 ships
Daegu-class frigates
Ships built by Daewoo Shipbuilding & Marine Engineering